Fuzhou Lakeside International School is an English-language international school in Fuzhou, Fujian, China, established in September 2012. It caters to students in grades preschool through high school. As of 2015, it is Fuzhou's only school that accepts non-Chinese students as well as students from Hong Kong, Taiwan, and Macau.

References

External links

 Fuzhou Lakeside International School
  Fuzhou Lakeside International School

Schools in Fuzhou
High schools in Fujian
International schools in China
2012 establishments in China
Educational institutions established in 2012